For Real! is an album by American jazz pianist Hampton Hawes recorded in 1958 but not released on the Contemporary label until 1961.

Reception
The Allmusic review by Scott Yanow states "pianist Hawes sounds inspired by the other players and is in top form throughout the generally memorable outing".

Track listing
 "Hip" (Hampton Hawes) - 6:14
 "Wrap Your Troubles in Dreams" (Harry Barris, Ted Koehler, Billy Moll) - 9:20 		
 "Crazeology" (Benny Harris) - 6:40
 "Numbers Game" (Hawes, Harold Land) - 8:04
 "For Real" (Hawes, Land) - 11:21
 "I Love You" (Cole Porter) - 3:56

Personnel
Hampton Hawes - piano
Harold Land - tenor saxophone   
Scott LaFaro - bass
Frank Butler - drums

References

Contemporary Records albums
Hampton Hawes albums
1961 albums